The 2020–21 Taça da Liga was the fourteenth edition of the Taça da Liga (also known as Allianz Cup for sponsorship reasons), a football league cup competition organised by the Liga Portuguesa de Futebol Profissional and contested exclusively by clubs competing in the two professional divisions of Portuguese football – the top-tier Primeira Liga and the second-tier Liga Portugal 2. Due to calendar limitations derived from the COVID-19 pandemic in Portugal, this season will follow a transitory format where only eight teams enter the competition.

The competition started with a quarter-final round played from 15 to 17 December 2020, and concluded with a final-four tournament, played at a neutral ground from 18 to 23 January 2021 with the final between Braga and Sporting CP. The Estádio Dr. Magalhães Pessoa in Leiria was chosen as the competition's final-four venue until 2023.

Braga were the holders and two-time winners, after beating Porto 1–0 in the 2020 final. Sporting CP won the final 1–0 over Braga for their third title.

Format
The top six teams from the Primeira Liga and the top two non-reserve teams from the Liga Portugal 2 at the end of November (matchday 8 for Primeira Liga and matchday 10 for Liga Portugal 2) will be paired according to their league positions to play single-leg quarter-final matches:

1st place (Primeira Liga) vs. 2nd place (Liga Portugal 2)
2nd place (Primeira Liga) vs. 1st place (Liga Portugal 2)
3rd place (Primeira Liga) vs. 6th place (Primeira Liga)
4th place (Primeira Liga) vs. 5th place (Primeira Liga)

The winners qualify to the final-four tournament, which was played at a neutral venue and comprised two single-leg semi-finals and a final. The final four was scheduled to be played at the Estádio Dr. Magalhães Pessoa, in Leiria, until 2023.

Qualified teams

Quarter-finals
In this round, teams were paired according to their league position at the end of November, with the best placed teams playing at home.

Final-four
The final-four was played from 16 to 23 January 2021 in Estádio Dr. Magalhães Pessoa, Leiria, and comprised the semi-finals and final of the competition. The draw for this stage, where the semi-finals' pairings were made and the administrative home team was decided for both semi-finals and final, was made through videoconference on 21 December 2020, by Helton.

Bracket

Semi-finals

Final

References

External links
 Liga Portugal official website

Taça da Liga
Taca da Liga
Portugal